Centerville is a city in Leon County, in the U.S. state of Texas. The population was 905 at the 2020 census. It is the county seat of Leon County. Centerville was so named as it is near the geographic center of Leon County.

History
Centerville became the county seat of Leon County in 1850.  It was originally built on 200 acres donated by Robert J Townes and D.C. Carrington.

The town established an annual Black-Eyed Pea Festival in 1937.

Geography

Climate
The climate in this area is characterized by hot, humid summers and generally mild to cool winters. According to the Köppen climate classification, Centerville has a humid subtropical climate, Cfa on climate maps.

Demographics

As of the 2020 United States census, there were 905 people, 371 households, and 239 families residing in the city.

At the 2000 census, 903 people, 388 households, and 230 families  were living in the city. The population density was 620.9 people per square mile (240.4/km2). The 464 housing units had an average density of 319.0/sq mi (123.6/km2).  The racial makeup of the city was 75.30% White, 21.82% African American, 0.33% Native American, 0.22% Asian, 1.66% from other races, and 0.66% from two or more races. Hispanics or Latinos of any race were 1.99%.

Of the 388 households, 25.3% had children under  18 living with them, 46.4% were married couples living together, 10.3% had a female householder with no husband present, and 40.5% were not families. About 38.1% of households were one person, and 22.9% were one person aged 65 or older. The average household size was 2.17, and the average family size was 2.89.

The age distribution was 22.1% under 18, 6.3% from 18 to 24, 22.6% from 25 to 44, 25.0% from 45 to 64, and 23.9% 65 or older. The median age was 44 years. For every 100 females, there were 83.9 males. For every 100 females age 18 and over, there were 77.5 males.

The median  income for a household was $25,677 and for a family  was $35,278. Males had a median income of $38,125 versus $19,167 for females. The per capita income for the city was $15,469. About 14.9% of families and 19.1% of the population were below the poverty line, including 19.7% of those under age 18 and 20.9% of those age 65 or over.

Education
The City of Centerville is served by the Centerville Independent School District.

Notable people
Marva Black Beck, Texas politician 
Lightnin' Hopkins, blues singer; born in Centerville in 1912

References

External links

Cities in Texas
Cities in Leon County, Texas
County seats in Texas